Eeshwar may refer to:
 Eeshwar (1989 film), an Indian film
 Eeswar, a 2002 Telugu film
 Eeshwar Nivas, Indian film director
 Ishvara